Computer University, Hpa-An is located on the west bank of Salween river near the city of Hpa-an Township, Kayin State in Myanmar. The university is administered by the Ministry of Science and Technology (Myanmar).

History 

Computer University, Hpa-An was formerly opened as Government Computer College (GCC) on 3 September 2001.  The university was then promoted to university level on 20 January 2007.

Department
 Software Department
 Hardware Department
 Burmese Department
 English Department
 Mathematics Department

Graduate programs

Post Graduate Programs

Undergraduate program

References

External links
 Computer University (Hpa-An) in google books

Educational institutions established in 2001
Technological universities in Myanmar
Buildings and structures in Kayin State
Arts and Science universities in Myanmar
2001 establishments in Myanmar